National Highway 716A, commonly referred to as NH 716A is a national highway in India. It is a spur road of National Highway 16.  NH-716A traverses the states of Andhra Pradesh and Tamil Nadu in India.

Route 
Andhra Pradesh
Puttur, Narayana Vanam, Thumburu, Koppedu, Harijan, Vada, Ramagiri, Krishnapuram,  Vinobhanagar , Nagalapuram. 

Tamil Nadu
Uthukkottai - Tamil Nadu border, A.P. border - Tharachi, Palavakkam, Periyapalam, Kannigaipair, Janappachataram.

Junctions  
 
  Terminal near Puttur.
  Terminal near Janappachataram.

See also 
 List of National Highways in India
 List of National Highways in India by state

References

External links 

 NH 716A on OpenStreetMap

National highways in India
National Highways in Andhra Pradesh
National Highways in Tamil Nadu